is a manga artist. Ito drew Yu-Gi-Oh! R while the creator of the Yu-Gi-Oh! franchise, Kazuki Takahashi, came up with the storyline. Ito's drawing style is similar to Takahashi's. Ito later co-created Cardfight!! Vanguard in collaboration with Satoshi Nakamura (Duel Masters), and Bushiroad president Takaaki Kidani.

Ito worked as a staff member for the Yu-Gi-Oh! manga.

References

Living people
Manga artists
Year of birth missing (living people)